Mary Watson (17 January 1860 – 1881), was an Australian folk heroine. She was 21 years old and had been married less than eighteen months when she died of thirst on No. 5 Island in the Howick Group now called Watson’s Island north of Cape Flattery in Far North Queensland, Australia, in 1881. She, with her four-month-old baby, Ferrier, and a wounded Chinese workman, Ah Sam, had drifted for eight days and some forty miles in a cut-down ship's water tank, used for boiling sea slugs, after mainland Aboriginal people had attacked her absent husband's bêche de mer station on Lizard Island. Her diary describing their last days was found with their remains in 1882, and Watson became an emblem of pioneer heroism for many Queenslanders.

Early life
Mary Watson was born at Fiddler's Green outside St Newlyn East near Truro, Cornwall, England, on 17 January 1860, the daughter of Mary Phillips and Thomas Oxnam, and migrated to Queensland with her family in 1877. Having accepted a position as a governess with an hotelier's family, at eighteen she travelled from Maryborough to the isolated port of Cooktown, where she met and married a bêche de mer fisherman, Captain Robert F. Watson, in May 1880.

Lizard Island
Robert Watson took her with him to set up a fishing station on Lizard Island, then otherwise uninhabited. In September 1880, he left Watson and their son behind with two Chinese servants known as Ah Sam and Ah Leung, while he and his partner Percy Fuller made an extended fishing trip in their luggers.

Attack
A few weeks later a party of mainland Aboriginal Guugu Yimithirr people made one of their habitual seasonal trips by canoe to the island, where Robert Watson had set up his household in a stone structure close to a small creek, the island's only supply of fresh water. Watson had probably also inadvertently trespassed on an indigenous ceremonial ground normally taboo to women and children. The Aboriginal people attacked Ah Sam, who suffered seven spear wounds, and Ah Leung was killed in a vegetable garden he was tending. Watson frightened off the group by firing a shotgun and then, with a small supply of food and water, put to sea in the iron sea cucumber tank, hoping to be picked up by a passing vessel. The party drifted from 2 to 7 October, occasionally landing on reefs and islets. Her final diary entry ended 'No water. Near dead with thirst.'

When passing fishing vessels reported the wreck of Mrs Watson's stone cottage, and fires burning on the island, it was assumed that Watson had been kidnapped or killed. Mounted police and native troopers under Inspector Hervey Fitzgerald from Cooktown shot a number of coastal Cape York people—possibly as many as 150— from three mainland groups in retaliation. None of those shot, it would be claimed afterwards, was directly involved in the events.

Remains found
The remains of Watson and her baby were found some months later among the mangroves on No. 5 Howick Island, still in the iron tank, but now covered with fresh rainwater from a recent tropical downpour. Ah Sam had died on the beach nearby. A concealed spring existed on the islet, but they had not found it. When the bodies were returned to Cooktown, a procession of 650 escorted them to their burial at Two Mile Cemetery (now Cooktown Cemetery), on the road to the Palmer River goldfields.

Legacy 

In the intervening years, Watson's story was retold in numerous newspaper and folk accounts, including heroic poems, usually with little attention given to the Aboriginal and Chinese aspect of the events.

Five years after her death, a public subscription was raised to fund the Mary Watson's Monument, a marble drinking fountain in the main street, completed in 1886.

A highly dramatic version of the story has been told by Australian author Ion Idriess in one of his a lesser-known titles The Opium Smugglers (1948), and was touched upon by Robert Drewe in his novel, The Savage Crows (1976). Australian painter Alan Oldfield's series of paintings 'The Story of Mrs Watson, 1881', begun in 1986 and exploring the spiritual dimensions of the events, are now in the permanent collection of the Cairns Art Gallery, North Queensland.

An Arthur C Clarke character in his 1963 novel Dolphin Island accurately retells the tale mentioning both Aboriginal people and Chinese servants changing only the island's name to Dolphin Island.

The Queensland Museum holds the iron tank, the paddles, and Watson's bible. The John Oxley Library holds her two diaries (her regular diary on Lizard Island and the one she wrote during the voyage in the tank). The diaries are considered a treasure of the State Library of Queensland featured on the John Oxley Library blog. The James Cook Historical Museum in Cooktown holds a replica of the iron tank.

Citations

Sources
 Suzanne Falkiner and Alan Oldfield, Lizard Island: The Story of Mary Watson, Allen and Unwin (2000)
 Judy Johnson, The Secret Fate of Mary Watson, Fourth Estate (2011)

Notes

References

External links

 Australian Dictionary of Biography: Watson, Mary Beatrice Phillips (1860-1881)
 ‘Mary Watson and the sea cucumber tub’ - podcast by The Australian 
Mary Watson Diaries, January - October 1881: treasure collection of the John Oxley Library - State Library of Queensland 

1860 births
1881 deaths
Deaths by dehydration
Australian people of Cornish descent
British emigrants to Australia
19th-century Australian women